Ernest Nicol Ackerley (23 September 1943 – 1 June 2017) was a professional footballer who played in the Football League as a forward. He was born in Scotland and grew up in Manchester.

References 
General
 . Retrieved 28 October 2013.
Specific

1943 births
2017 deaths
Footballers from Manchester
Footballers from Dunfermline
Scottish footballers
Association football forwards
Manchester United F.C. players
Barrow A.F.C. players
South Melbourne FC players
English Football League players